Michael Detlef Stich (born 18 October 1968) is a German former professional tennis player. He won the men's singles title at Wimbledon in 1991, the men's doubles titles at both Wimbledon and the Olympic Games in 1992, and was a singles runner-up at the 1994 US Open and the 1996 French Open. Stich won 18 singles titles and ten doubles titles. His career-high singles ranking was world No. 2, achieved in 1993.

Career
Stich was raised in Elmshorn, Schleswig-Holstein. He turned professional in 1988 and won his first top-level singles title in 1990 at Memphis, Tennessee.

Stich won Wimbledon in 1991. He defeated the defending champion and world No. 1 Stefan Edberg in the semifinals, 4–6, 7–6, 7–6, 7–6, without breaking his service once. Then in the final, he beat his compatriot and three-time Wimbledon champion Boris Becker in straight sets.

In 1992, Stich teamed with John McEnroe to win the men's doubles title at Wimbledon in a five-set, five-hour final that stretched into Monday (the day after the tournament normally ends) and ended with a 19–17 set. No male player since has won both singles and doubles at Wimbledon. Then at the Summer Olympic Games in Barcelona, Stich teamed with Becker to win the men's doubles gold medal. Stich also won the 1992 Grand Slam Cup, defeating Michael Chang in the final.

A major highlight of 1993 for Stich came at the end-of-year ATP World Championships, where he was the only player in the 1990s history of the Championship tournament to claim the title undefeated, overcoming Pete Sampras in the final. Playing for Germany, Stich also won both the Davis Cup and the Hopman Cup in 1993.

He reached his second Grand Slam singles final at the 1994 US Open, where he lost in straight sets to Andre Agassi. Stich also helped Germany win the World Team Cup in 1994.

He upset defending champion Thomas Muster in four sets in the fourth round of the 1996 French Open en route to appearing in his third and final Grand Slam singles final, where he lost to Yevgeny Kafelnikov in straight sets. He also won his final career singles title that year at Antwerp. His last doubles title came in 1997 at Halle.

Stich's all-round ability, both from the baseline and at the net, allowed him to become one of the few players to win both singles and doubles tournaments on all surfaces. He is one of only five players of his generation to have a positive career head-to-head record against Sampras.

Stich announced his retirement from the professional tour in 1997, after Wimbledon. His last run at Wimbledon started with a win over US top-ten player Jim Courier and ended with a five-set loss to Cédric Pioline in the semifinals.

Since his retirement, he has devoted most of his time to his AIDS foundation. He also works as a tennis commentator for the BBC. In 2018, he was inducted into the International Tennis Hall of Fame. Stich was married to the German actress Jessica Stockmann from 1992 to 2003. In 2005, he married Alexandra Rikowski. They live in Hamburg.

Grand Slam finals

Singles: 3 (1–2)

Doubles: 1 (1–0)

Other significant finals

Year-end championships finals

Singles: 1 (1–0)

Grand Slam Cup finals: 2 (1–1)

Olympic men's doubles final

Masters Series finals

Singles: 3 (2–1)

Doubles: 3 (1–2)

Career finals

Singles: 31 (18–13)

Doubles: 16 (10–6)

Performance timelines

Singles

1 Held as Stockholm Masters until 1994, Stuttgart Masters from 1995 onward.

Doubles

Top 10 wins

Record against No. 1 players
Stich's match record against players who have been ranked world No. 1.

Notes

References

External links

 
 
 

1968 births
Grand Slam (tennis) champions in men's singles
Grand Slam (tennis) champions in men's doubles
Living people
People from Pinneberg
German male tennis players
Hopman Cup competitors
Olympic gold medalists for Germany
Olympic medalists in tennis
Olympic tennis players of Germany
Sportspeople from Schleswig-Holstein
Tennis players from Hamburg
Recipients of the Cross of the Order of Merit of the Federal Republic of Germany
Tennis commentators
Tennis players at the 1992 Summer Olympics
Recipients of the Silver Laurel Leaf
Medalists at the 1992 Summer Olympics
International Tennis Hall of Fame inductees
West German male tennis players
Wimbledon champions